The Anderson Style Shop, at 222 Main St. in Kalispell, Montana, was built in 1941.  It was designed by Kalispell architect Fred Brinkman in Moderne style.  It was listed on the National Register of Historic Places in 1994.

The original store on lot was moved to there from Demerville in 1891 or 1892.  The current building was built in 1941 at cost of $17,500 for storeowner Carl Anderson.

It was deemed significant for its "distinctive commercial facade on Kalispell's Main Street".

References

Commercial buildings on the National Register of Historic Places in Montana
Moderne architecture in the United States
Commercial buildings completed in 1941
National Register of Historic Places in Flathead County, Montana
1941 establishments in Montana
Kalispell, Montana